Grace was launched at Ipswich in 1811. She spent most of her career sailing to South America. However, she was returning to Britain from New South Wales in 1822 when a fire that started in her cargo destroyed her.

Career
Grace entered Lloyd's Register (LR) in 1812 with Smith, master, changing to J. Kerr, and Bond & co., owner. Later, the British East India Company licensed her to travel east of the Cape of Good Hope.

Grace, Lethbridge, master, left Cowes on 20 April 1821 with merchandise and passengers. On 11 July she struck some rocks coming into port at Hobart, Van Diemen's Land, although she was under the control of a pilot. She could not be gotten off until she was lightened. She arrived in the Derwent on 10 August. She was not holed and by 1 September she had completed her repairs and was again ready for the sea.

Loss
Grace was under the command of Captain Robert Lethbridge when she left Sydney on 19 February 1822 carrying a cargo of whale oil and wool. During the journey, which took 14 weeks, gales badly battered Grace; the oil sprung a leak and saturated the wool, which with the movement eventually spontaneously combusted. Grace was in sight of Simon's Bay at the time the fire was discovered. While five men stayed on board to fight the fire, douse the hatches and keep them sealed, the remaining passengers and crew stood off in a longboat, towed behind Grace. However, the crew were unable to keep the fire under control and as she neared Struys Bay, she burst into flames. The remaining crew were taken on the longboat and the tow was cut. Grace grounded and burned down to the water line. The passengers and crew reached the shore without harm and six days later made it overland to Cape Town.  

While most of the mail was lost, dispatches from Governor Macquarie were saved and for doing so, Captain Lethbridge was awarded  at Bridgeman, near Singleton, when he settled in New South Wales in 1825. Twenty-one barrels of oil and 38 bales of cotton drifted ashore.

Citations

References
 
 

Maritime history of Australia
Shipwrecks in the Indian Ocean
Ships built in England
Sailing ships
Individual sailing vessels
Maritime incidents in June 1822
1811 ships